Matisa Matériel Industriel S.A. is a Swiss company founded in 1945 and based in the canton of Vaud that manufactures rail maintenance machines and provides associated services.

Matisa produces a range of maintenance machinery for the rail industry including tampers and track inspection vehicles.

The company employs around 550 people at the Crissier works with seven subsidiaries that operate around the world.

Products
Products include:

 Plain line and Universal tamping machines
 Ballast regulators
 Ballast cleaners
 Continuous track renewal trains
 Continuous track construction trains
 Track inspection vehicles
 Switch Transport wagons

They have supplied products to various customers including London Underground, VolkerRail, South Australian Railways, Colas Rail and the Korean State Railway.

See also 
 Plasser & Theurer

Reference list

Companies of Switzerland